René Joffroy (10 June 1915 – 5 May 1986) was a French archaeologist.

Publications 
1960: L’Oppidum de Vix et la civilisation hallstattienne finale thèse d’État
1961: La tombe princière de Vix Côte d'or, Boudrot
1979: Vix et ses trésors  - Paris
1984: Initiation à l’archéologie de la France, éditions Tallandier, Paris. Prix Broquette-Gonin of the Académie française

References

1915 births
1986 deaths
People from Chaumont, Haute-Marne
French archaeologists
French curators
Winners of the Prix Broquette-Gonin (literature)
Commandeurs of the Ordre des Arts et des Lettres
20th-century archaeologists